Filipiak is a Polish surname. Notable people with the surname include:

 Bartosz Filipiak (born 1994), Polish volleyball player
 Bolesław Filipiak (1901–1978), Polish Cardinal
 Carl Filipiak, American jazz guitarist
 Izabela Filipiak, Polish writer
 Kacper Filipiak, Polish snooker player